Principality of Pavia (Lombard: Principaa de Pavia, Italian: Principato di Pavia) was an historic division of the Duchy of Milan, which was ranked as a principality as an honor to the reigning House of Milan.

History 
The area, originally a county under the direct rule of the Duke of Milan, was elevated to the rank of principality by the Emperor Maximilian I in 1499. 

In 1564 the Spanish government introduced a General Congregation, elected by village representatives, to legitimize raising taxes and to make the tax systems of cities and counties more equal.

In 1703 the Lomellina was ceded to the House of Savoy.

In 1743 a portion of its territory, mainly the Vigevano zone and the Oltrepò, was sold to the House of Savoy. The principality tried unsuccessfully to appeal to the governor.

In 1786 the Austrian government of the Duchy decided to transform the Principality into the province of Pavia.

Division 
It was divided in 1565 into four districts, each with a sindaco (mayor) as a head of government. They were Oltrepò, Lomellina, Upper County and Lower County. The sindaco of the Oltrepò had more power because of the insulated nature of its territory.

Every district was made up of communes, which had power over the local police and  had some autonomy on the justice. They also each had an elected treasurer and assembly. In the important communities there was a Podestà, nominated by central authorities.

In the mid-1700s there were 146 communes, including farmhouses, formally included into bigger communes but autonomous in fiscal and administrative ways.

Bibliography 
 Storia della Lomellina, e del principato di Pavia dai suoi primi abitatori, sino all'anno 1746. Divisa in due parti, Portalupi, Luigi
 Terra, fiscalità, smembramenti: città e campagna nel Principato di Pavia nei secoli XVI - XVIII, pp. 161-199, Giuseppe Negro, Società Pavese di Storia Patria e della Banca del Monte di Pavia
Del Principato di Pavia ovvero Thesaurus Ticinensis con le mappe di Pavia, Lomellina, Oltrepò, Pavese e della Certosa di Pavia, 1994

References

External links 
 principato di Pavia
Storia urbana di Pavia - Musei Civici

Pavia
Duchy of Milan
1499 establishments in Europe
1786 disestablishments in the Habsburg monarchy